Alberto Favara (1863-1923), an Italian ethnomusicologist, is one of the pioneers of the scholarly study of Sicilian folk music. He studied at the Palermo music conservatory and later in Milan. In 1895 he became a music professor at the Palermo conservatory. In 1907 he published Canti della terra e del mare di Sicilia (Songs of the land and sea of Sicily), followed in 1921 by an additional collection of  Canti popolari siciliani (Sicilian Folk Songs). Favara was also the composer of miscellaneous vocal works and instrumental pieces for orchestra and chamber groups.

1863 births
1923 deaths